Valdoie is a commune in the Territoire de Belfort department in Bourgogne-Franche-Comté in northeastern France. It is located to the North of the city of Belfort and comprises part of greater Belfort.

Name 

Valdoie is situated on the river Savoureuse (Doubs basin). The name is thought to have come from combining the Latin word Vadum (meaning shallow crossing) and the Celtic word Oye (meaning water or river).

Population

See also

Communes of the Territoire de Belfort department

References

Communes of the Territoire de Belfort